Conor Clancy (born 1993) is an Irish hurler who plays for Offaly Senior Championship club St Rynagh's and at inter-county level with the Offaly senior hurling team.  He usually lines out as a goalkeeper.

Honours

St Rynagh's
Offaly Senior Hurling Championship: 2016, 2019 (c) 

Offaly
Christy Ring Cup: 2021

References

1993 births
Living people
St Rynagh's hurlers
Offaly inter-county hurlers
Hurling goalkeepers